Peripsocus stagnivagus is a species of stout barklouse in the family Peripsocidae. It is found in the Caribbean, Central America, North America, and South America.

References

Peripsocidae
Articles created by Qbugbot
Insects described in 1930